Yu Mengyu (born 18 August 1989) is a retired Chinese-born Singaporean table tennis player. Born in Liaoning, China, Yu left China in 2006 at the age of 17 to join the Singapore Table Tennis Association (STTA).

She was part of the team that won the 2010 World Team Table Tennis Championships in Moscow, Russia. She represented Singapore in the 2016 and 2020 Summer Olympics (Team & Singles).

Yu retired from the national team on 22 March 2022. The Tokyo Olympics was her final international tournament.

Early life 
Yu was born and raised in Liaoning. She started practising table tennis from the age of five and eventually become a provincial player. During an event in Beijing when she was 16, Yu was spotted by STTA coach Chen Yong. Chen invited her to go to Singapore for further training. With the opportunity to compete in international competitions, Yu took the offer and joined the STTA.

Career

2016 Summer Olympics 
Yu participated in ITTF Asian-Olympics Qualifier (South-East Asian region) at Hong Kong from 13 to 17 April 2016. She was the runner-up in SEA group, losing to her team-mate, Feng Tianwei. According to May 2016 ranking published by International Table Tennis Federation, she qualified for the singles event at Rio de Janeiro Olympics. This was her Olympics debut. She was seeded ninth in singles event and fourth in women's team event. She reached the singles Quarter-Final but lost 2–4 to Kim Song-i of North Korea.  The Singapore women's team, comprising Yu, Feng and Zhou Yihan, reached the semi-final of the team event but lost to China 0–3. In the bronze medal match, the trio was defeated by Japan 1–3.

Singles Event

Team Event

2018 Asian Games 
Yu entered the Asian Games as the 14th seed in the singles event. In the Round of 32, she defeated Alice Chang of Malaysia 4-1 (11-4, 11–2, 11–4, 7–11, 11–2) to set up a Round of 16 encounter with 6th seeded Doo Hoi Kem. Yu defeated Doo in a nail-biting contest that was stretched to the maximum seven games, winning 4-3 (5-11, 13–11, 11–8, 7–11, 12–10, 9–11, 11–6). In the quarterfinals, Yu pulled off a shock win against 3rd seed Cheng I-ching, winning 4-1 (11-7, 11–6, 9–11, 11–4, 11–3). In the semifinals, Yu played against 2nd seeded Wang Manyu of China, losing 1-4 (7-11, 6–11, 5–11, 11–9, 7–11). As a result of reaching the semifinals, Yu clinched the bronze medal in the singles event.

Yu also participated in the team event together with Feng Tianwei, Lin Ye, Zhang Wanling and Pearlyn Koh. The team progressed to the knockout stage after finishing 2nd out of 5 teams in the group stage. In the quarterfinals of the knockout stage, Singapore was drawn to face South Korea. In the first match, Feng put Singapore 1-0 up after defeating defensive chopper Suh Hyo-won 3-1 (9-11, 11–6, 11–9, 11–7). However, Yu lost the second match to Jeon Ji-hee 1-3 (11-9, 10–12, 9–11, 11–13). Lin then lost out to Yang Ha-eun in straight games (6-11, 11–13, 3–11) and Feng was defeated by Jeon (8-11, 8–11, 8–11) in the fourth match, leading to an overall 1–3 loss against South Korea.

2020 Summer Olympics 
Yu defeated fourth seed Cheng I-ching of Chinese Taipei in the round of 32 and fifth seed Kasumi Ishikawa of Japan in the quarter-finals. Yu faced Chen Meng of China in the semi-final match. During the 4th set against Chen, she suffered an injury to her left thigh. Yu eventually lost the match 4–0. Yu later faced Mima Ito in the Bronze Medal match on the same day, initially winning the 1st set but eventually lost the match 4–1. Overall, she placed 4th in the Women's singles category.

Yu also participated in the Women's Team event with Feng Tianwei and Lin Ye. In the Round of 16, Singapore defeated France 3–0. In the first match (doubles), Yu paired up with Lin to win 3-0 (11-6, 11–5, 13–11) against the French pair of Loeuillette Stephanie and Jia Nan Yuan. Feng won the second match with a 3–2 victory over Prithika Pavade. In the third match, Yu defeated Yuan 3-1 (11-8, 7–11, 11–5, 11–8), wrapping up an overall 3–0 victory for Singapore. In the quarterfinals, Singapore faced China, the top seed and eventual gold medallists in the Team event. In the first match, Yu and Lin lost out in straight games (5-11, 7–11, 5–11) to China's Chen Meng and Wang Manyu. Feng then lost the second match to singles silver medallist Sun Yingsha, and Wang wrapped up the victory for China following a 3–1 win over Olympics debutant Lin in the third match.

Yu announced it will be her last participation at the Olympics.

Singles Event

Team Event

Retirement and assistant coach appointment 
Yu announced her retirement from the national team on 22 March 2022 at the Singapore Table Tennis Association's Annual Awards Night. After her retirement, she was appointed as an assistant coach for the Singapore Table Tennis Association's junior development squad for high-profile players aged 9 to 12.

Career records
Singles 
Olympics: QF (2016); 4th (2020).
World Championships: round of 64 (2013, 2017) ; round of 32 (2011); round of 16 (2009, 2015).
World Cup: QF (2012).
World Tour Grand Finals: QF (2009); SF (2014).
Asian Championships: round of 16 (2007, 2009); QF (2013).
Asian Cup: 3rd (2014), QF (2016).
Asian Games: 3rd (2018).
Commonwealth Games: 2nd (2010, 2014, 2018).
Southeast Asian Games: 1st (2013).

Women's doubles
World Championships: round of 16 (2009); 3rd (2013, 2015, 2017).
World Tour Grand Finals: SF (2009); 1st (2012).
Asian Championships: 3rd (2007, 2009).
Commonwealth Games: 1st (2014, 2018).
Southeast Asian Games: 1st (2009, 2017); 2nd (2015).

Mixed doubles
World Championships: round of 64 (2009); round of 32 (2015); round of 16 (2011, 2013).
 Southeast Asian Games: 1st (2015), 2nd (2017).
Asian Championships: 2nd (2015).
Commonwealth Games: 1st (2018).

Team
Olympics: 4th (2016).
World Championships: 1st (2010); 2nd (2008, 2012); 3rd (2014); QF (2016).
World Team Cup: 2nd (2009, 2010); 3rd (2011, 2013, 2015).
Asian Championships: 2nd (2007, 2009, 2012), 3rd (2013).
Asian Games: 2nd (2010); 3rd (2014); QF (2018).
Commonwealth Games: 1st (2010, 2014); 2nd (2018).
Southeast Asian Games: 1st (2009, 2013, 2015, 2017).

References

External links
 

Living people
1989 births
Table tennis players from Liaoning
Chinese emigrants to Singapore
Singaporean sportspeople of Chinese descent
Naturalised citizens of Singapore
Naturalised table tennis players
Chinese female table tennis players
Singaporean female table tennis players
Commonwealth Games gold medallists for Singapore
Table tennis players at the 2010 Commonwealth Games
Asian Games medalists in table tennis
Table tennis players at the 2010 Asian Games
Table tennis players at the 2014 Asian Games
Table tennis players at the 2018 Asian Games
Table tennis players at the 2014 Commonwealth Games
Table tennis players at the 2016 Summer Olympics
Table tennis players at the 2020 Summer Olympics
Olympic table tennis players of Singapore
Asian Games silver medalists for Singapore
Asian Games bronze medalists for Singapore
Commonwealth Games medallists in table tennis
Medalists at the 2010 Asian Games
Medalists at the 2014 Asian Games
Medalists at the 2018 Asian Games
Table tennis players at the 2018 Commonwealth Games
Southeast Asian Games medalists in table tennis
Southeast Asian Games gold medalists for Singapore
Southeast Asian Games silver medalists for Singapore
World Table Tennis Championships medalists
Competitors at the 2009 Southeast Asian Games
Competitors at the 2013 Southeast Asian Games
Competitors at the 2015 Southeast Asian Games
Competitors at the 2017 Southeast Asian Games
Singaporean expatriate sportspeople in Japan
Chinese expatriate sportspeople in Japan
Expatriate table tennis people in Japan
Medallists at the 2010 Commonwealth Games
Medallists at the 2014 Commonwealth Games
Medallists at the 2018 Commonwealth Games